Anderson Costa may refer to:

 Anderson Costa (footballer, born 1980), Anderson José de Jesus Costa, Brazilian football striker
 Anderson Costa (footballer, born 1984), Brazilian football forward